Allow Me is a bronze sculpture by John Seward Johnson II. Casts of Allow Me are displayed as public art in Bath, New York; Chicago; in front of the Prince Music Theater in Philadelphia; on Embassy Row (2346 Massachusetts Ave. NW) in Washington DC; and in Portland, Oregon. Three additional casts exist in private collections in Hamilton, Ohio, Los Angeles and Fort Smith, Arkansas.

See also

 Allow Me (Portland, Oregon)
 List of public art in Chicago
 List of public art in Philadelphia

References

External links
 

Bronze sculptures in Illinois
Bronze sculptures in New York (state)
Bronze sculptures in Pennsylvania
Embassy Row
Outdoor sculptures in Chicago
Outdoor sculptures in New York (state)
Outdoor sculptures in Philadelphia
Sculptures by John Seward Johnson II
Sculptures of men in Illinois
Sculptures of men in New York (state)
Sculptures of men in Pennsylvania
Sculptures of men in Washington, D.C.
Statues in Chicago
Statues in New York (state)
Statues in Pennsylvania
Statues in Washington, D.C.